Cumbia  is a folkloric genre and dance from Colombia.

Since the 1940s, commercial or modern Colombian cumbia had expanded to the rest of Latin America, and many countries have had their own variants of cumbia after which it became popular throughout the Latin American regions, including in Argentina, Bolivia, Chile, Costa Rica, Ecuador, El Salvador, Guatemala, Honduras, Mexico, Nicaragua, Panama, Paraguay, Peru, the United States, Uruguay, and Venezuela.

Etymology
Most folklorists and musicologists, such as Narciso Garay, Delia Zapata Olivella, and Guillermo Abadia Morales, assume that cumbia is derived from the Bantu root kumbe "to dance", or any other of the many Bantu words with "comb" or "kumb". Cf. samba, macumba.

Another possibility is the Tupi-Guarani word cumbi "murmuring, noise".

Cumbia was also a kind of fine woolen garment produced for the Inca.

In 2006, Colombian musician and musicologist Guillermo Carbo Ronderos said that the etymology of the word cumbia is "still controversial" and that "seems to derive from the Bantu word cumbé"

Origins
Sociologist Adolfo Gonzalez Henriquez, in his work "La música del Caribe colombiano durante la guerra de independencia y comienzos de la República" (Music of the Colombian Caribbean during the war of independence and the beginning of the Republic), includes a text of Admiral José Prudencio Padilla which records cumbiambas and indigenous gaitas during the festival of John the Baptist in the neighboring town of Arjona, a few days before the naval battle that took place in the Bahía de las Ánimas of Cartagena between the last Spanish resistance and the republican army, military confrontation that sealed the independence of Colombia:

Translated as

The musician and pedagogue Luis Antonio Escobar, in the chapter "La mezcla de indio y negro" (The mixture of Indian and black) of his book "Música en Cartagena de Indias" (Music in Cartagena de Indias) takes the description of Indian dance who witnessed the navy lieutenant Swedish Carl August Gosselman in Santa Marta, and recorded in his work "Viaje por Colombia: 1825 y 1826" (Journey through Colombia: 1825 and 1826) as proof that at least in the second decade of the nineteenth century the gaita ensemble existed already in Santa Marta, the same that appears in Cartagena and other coastal cities with black musical elements that resulted in cumbia:

Translated as:

In the description of the writer José María Samper during his trip down the Magdalena River in 1879, the constituent elements of dance and music on the Magdalena River, instruments and elements of dance cumbia are identified:

Translated as:

In his work Lecturas locales (Local Readings) (1953), the barranquillero historian Miguel Goenaga barranquillero describes the cumbia and its cumbiamba circles in Barranquilla around 1888:

Translated as:

Controversy 

The origin of cumbia has been the subject of argument between those who attribute an indigenous ethno-musical origin, geographically located in the Depresión Momposina Province and those who argue the thesis of origin black African in Cartagena or even in Africa itself. The first, represented by personalities like the composer José Barros, writers like Jocé G. Daniels, sociologists like Orlando Fals Borda and historians as Gnecco Rangel Pava, and the latter by the folklorist Delia Zapata Olivella.

In 1998, in his article "La cumbia, emperadora del Pocabuy" (La cumbia, Empress of Pocabuy) the writer Jocé G. Daniels theorizes that the cumbia was "el aliciente espiritual de los indios" (the spiritual attraction of the Indians) to associate the flutes used in the celebrations of the Chimilas, pocigueycas and pocabuyes in the territories of the current populations of Guamal, Ciénaga and El Banco, with the primitive cumbia gaita, based on the report sent by the perpetual governor Lope de Orozco to the king in 1580, about the Province of Santa Marta, which recounts that "los yndios i yndias veben y asen fiestas con una caña a manera de flauta que se meten en la boca para tañer y producen una mucica como mui trayda del infierno" (The Indians drink and party with a cane that is used as a flute, which they put in their mouths to be played and that produces a music that seems to come from the very hell) (sic).

The banqueño songwriter Antonio Garcia presented in 1997 the following theory about the birth of cumbia: "Las tribus dedicadas a la pesca y la agricultura, en sus rituales fúnebres, especialmente cuando moría algún miembro de la alta jerarquía de la tribu, todos los miembros se reunían al caer la noche alrededor de una fogata, en el centro del círculo se colocaba a una mujer embarazada que era símbolo de la nueva vida, quien iniciaba una danza con el ritmo suave y melancólico de la flauta de millo, esta ceremonia se prolongaba por varias horas y terminaba por sumir en el más grande éxtasis a todos los que estaban allí reunidos y así nació la cumbia" (The tribes engaged in fishing and agriculture, in their funeral rituals, especially when someone in the hierarchy of the tribe died, gathered all members at nightfall around a campfire in the center of the circle stood a pregnant woman who was a symbol of new life, who started a dance with the soft and melancholic rhythm from flute of millo, this ceremony was prolonged for several hours and ended up plunging into the greatest ecstasy to all who were gathered there and cumbia was born). At the same meeting, José Barros said, product of the oral tradition received from the Indians: "The cumbia was born in funeral ceremonies that Chimillas Indians celebrated in the country of Pocabuy when one of its leaders died" (La cumbia nació en las ceremonias fúnebres que los indios Chimillas celebraban en el país de Pocabuy cuando moría uno de sus jerarcas).  Barros also holds in relation to dance: "The idea of dancing in a circular motion has to do with the custom of the Chimilas Indians who danced around the coffin of one of their leaders, what they did counter-clockwise, what meant one-way trip). Daniels adds that the musical airs related to the origin of the cumbia "had their peak between Chymilas, Pocigueycas (Ponqueycas) and Pocabuyes, i.e., in the actual populations of Guamal, Cienaga and El Banco. Cumbia reached its development with the elements provided by Bemba colorá blacks and whites, cunning and canny.".

To researchers of indigenous cultures, the ethno-musical mixture that gives rise to the cumbia occurs during the Colony in the native country of Pocabuy (current populations of El Banco, Guamal, Menchiquejo and San Sebastian in the Magdalena, Chiriguaná and Tamalameque in the Cesar and Mompox, Chilloa, Chimi and Guataca in Bolívar Department) located in the current Caribbean region of Colombia, in the upper valley of Magdalena region the Mompox Depression (including the cultures of La Sabana (Sucre),La Sabana  and the Sinú River, north to Pincoya), product of the musical and cultural fusion of Indigenous, Afro-Colombian slaves and, on a lesser extent, of Spaniards, as referred by it historians Orlando Fals Borda in his book Mompox y Loba, and Gnecco Rangel Pava in his books El País de Pocabuy and Aires Guamalenses. The Pocabuy are mentioned in several recordings, although the most famous mention corresponds to the chorus of the song "Cumbia de la paz" (Cumbia of peace) recorded by "Chico" Cervantes:

translated as:

Fals Borda notes:

translated as:

For the writer Jocé G. Daniels, is "ironic" that people have "tried to foist a Kumbé Bantú origin to cumbia." Researchers question that if the cumbia came from African rhythms, in other parts of America where blacks came from all over Africa as slaves, as the United States, there should be cumbia, or at least something similar. J. Barros says, "cumbia does not have a single hint of Africa. That's easy to check: the United States, which received so many thousands of black Africans does not have anything like cumbia in its folkloric manifestations. The same happens with the Antillean countries. I wonder why if the cumbia is African and entered through La Boquilla, like Manuel and Delia Zapata Olivella Dsay, in Puerto Tejada, for example, where there are also black people, and throughout the Pacific, cumbia is not a rhythm or appears in compositions ... I, who have been in contact with Pocabuyanos Indians since I was eight, who have had the opportunity since I was a child to interact with indigenous wome of 80 to 90 years telling her ritual, the cumbia ritual, I can certify the above, that the cumbia appeared every time the cacique died and they danced around the dead."

In turn, the Africanists place the emergence of the cumbia to contact the black slaves with Indians in ports like Cartagena, Ciénaga, Santa Marta and Riohacha, mainly in the first, during the celebrations of the Virgen de la Candelaria. The Afro-Colombianists dispute the origin of cumbia, and the place it Cartagena.

Some authors assume that the black element in cumbia comes from cumbé, a bantu rhythm and dance from Bioko island Bioko, Equatorial Guinea. 
The Africans who arrived as slaves to those regions, to tell the story of their ethnic groups and those famous deeds worthy to be stored in memory, used certain songs that they called areítos, which means "dance singing": putting up candles, they sang the coreo which was like the historical lesson that, after being heard and repeated many times, remained in the memory of all listeners. The center of the circle was occupied by those who gave the lesson singing and those more proficient in handling guacharacas, millos, drums and maracas, to sing with delicacy the music of those songs that suffer a transformation, with time, from being elegiac to exciting, gallant, complainant and amusing.

The cultural researcher A. Stevenson Samper refers to the work of General Joaquin Posada Gutierrez, "Fiestas de la Candelaria in La Popa" (1865), where the music and dance of the festivities of the Virgen de la Candelaria described in Cartagena and relates the following description with cumbia circle. The anthropologist Nina S. de Friedemann uses the same text to explain the configuration of cumbia within the scope of slavery in Cartagena de Indias:

That can be translated as

At least until the 1920s, the terms cumbia and mapalé designated the same rhythm in the area of Cartagena de Indias:

translated as

Regarding the cantares de vaquería (cowboy songs) as one of the origins of vallenato, the cultural and musical researcher Ciro Quiroz states about cumbia:

that is loosely translated as

Referring to the site of origin of vallenato, Quiroz notes on the site of origin of cumbia:

translated as

On the transition of whistles and flutes to the current vallenato instruments, the author says:

Translated as

On April 16, 1877 La Cumbia Soledeña was founded, one of the most distinguished and traditional cumbia groups.

Colombian tradition 

By the 1940s cumbia began spreading from the coast to other parts of Colombia alongside other costeña form of music, like porro and vallenato. Clarinetist Lucho Bermúdez helped bring cumbia into the country's interior. The early spread of cumbia internationally was helped by the number of record companies on the coast. Originally working-class populist music, cumbia was frowned upon by the elites, but as it spread, the class association subsided and cumbia became popular in every sector of society. The researcher Guillermo Abadía Morales in his "Compendium of Colombian folklore", Volume 3, # 7, published in 1962, states that "this explains the origin in the zambo conjugation of musical air by the fusion of the melancholy indigenous gaita flute or caña de millo, i.e., Tolo or Kuisí, of Kuna or Kogi ethnic groups, respectively, and the cheerful and impetuous resonance from the African drums. The ethnographic council has been symbolized in the different dancing roles that correspond to each sex." The presence of these cultural elements can be appreciated thus:

 In instrumentation are the drums; maracas, guache and the whistles (caña de millo and gaitas) of indigenous origin; whereas the songs and coplas are a contribution of Spanish poetics, although adapted later.
 Presence of sensual movements, distinctly charming, seductive, characteristic of dances with African origins.
 The vestments have clear Spanish features: long polleras, lace, sequins, hoop earrings, flower headdresses and intense makeup for women; white shirt and pants, knotted red shawl around the neck and hat reckless

Festivals

The most relevant cumbia festivals are:
 Festival Nacional de la Cumbia "José Barros": that is celebrated yearly in El Banco, Magdalena. It's was declared cultural heritage of the Nation by the Congress of Colombia in 2013.
Festival Nacional de la Cumbiamba: that is celebrated yearly in Cereté, Córdoba.
Sirenato de la Cumbia: celebrated yearly in Puerto Colombia, Atlántico.
Festival de Cumbia Autóctona del Caribe Colombiano: celebrated yearly in Barranquilla.
Festival de Bailadores de Cumbia: celebrated yearly in Barranquilla.

The carnaval de Barranquilla is the scenario of multiple cumbia performances and contests ; the main stage of the parades, Vía 40 Avenue, is called the "cumbiódromo" during the days of carnival, in analogy to the Sambadrome in Rio de Janeiro and other Brazilian cities.

Cultural Heritage of Colombia
In 2006, the cumbia was nominated by the magazine Semana and the Ministry of Culture as a cultural symbol of Colombia, being in the position twelve of fifty candidates.

In 2013 the Congress of Colombia declared the National Festival of the Cumbia Jose Barros of El Banco, Magdalena cultural heritage of the Nation.

Since 2013, the mayor of Guamal, Magdalena (municipality located in the territory of the former nation of Pocabuy), Alex Ricardo Rangel Arismendi, promotes the project to declare the cumbia as Intangible Cultural Heritage of the Nation Colombiana. Cumbia has been declared national heritage of Colombia in October 2022.

Modern cumbia in Colombia

Cumbia is present on the Caribbean coast, in the subregion around the Magdalena River delta invested, the Montes de María and riverine populations, with its epicenter in the Depresión momposina seat of ancient Pocabuy Indigenous country.

Traditional cumbia is preserved and considered representative of the Colombian identity, especially on the northern Caribbean coast. The best representation of traditional Cumbia is shown every year on the Festival de la Cumbia in El Banco, Magdalena. The festival was created by one of the most important Colombian Cumbia composers, Jose Barros, in order to preserve the original rhythms of traditional Cumbia music. Modern forms of cumbia are also combined with other genres like vallenato, electronica or rock. This mixing of genres is found in the music of modern artists, such as Carlos Vives, Bomba Estéreo, Andrés Cabas.

Since the 1980s, in the city of Medellín, there has been growing interest among young and middle-aged people in "rescuing" the masterpieces of the '50s.

Diffusion in Latin America

The most fruitful of Colombian music industry is given time in the 1960s, it began with the founding of Discos Fuentes in 1934, the Discos Sonolux in 1949 and soon after Discos Victoria. Since the 1940s, orchestras like Lucho Bermudez, Los Corraleros de Majagual, Los Hispanos or Los Graduados took the cumbia to Peru, where it became more known with groups such as Los Mirlos, Los Destellos, or Juaneco y Su Combo who were some of the first to give a proper rhythm to the Peruvian cumbia using as the main instrument electric guitars. Thanks to this it becomes much better known in Argentina, El Salvador, Mexico, Ecuador, Chile, Venezuela, among other. This led local musicians to give rise to variants of cumbia as a result of its fusionr with rhythms of each nation such as Argentine cumbia, Mexican cumbia, Salvadoran cumbia, etc.

Argentina

Cumbia and porro rhythms were introduced by Lucho Bermudez, who in 1946 recorded for RCA Víctor in Argentina 60 of his compositions with musicians provided by Eduardo Armani and Eugene Nobile. In the early 1960s, Bovea y sus vallenatos move to Argentina and popularizes cumbia in the country; the same was done by the Cuarteto Imperial, a Colombian band nationalized Argentine. The country has contributed musical compositions and own variations Cumbia villera, which resonates particularly with the poor and marginalized dwellers of villas miseria, (shanty towns, and slums); lyrics typically glorify theft and drug abuse. Undoubtedly the most refined version of Argentine cumbia is called Santa Fe cumbia or cumbia with guitar. In this style the main instrument is the guitar and its compositions are more complex. In the Santa Fe cumbia schemes of two or three simple chords and lyrics about dancing are abandoned, and melancholy lyrics and atypical chords are explored. Its creator, Juan Carlos Denis, is considered a hero of the local music. His creation became popular in 1978 with his album "A mi gente" and the band "Los del bohío".

Pablo Lescano, ex-member of Amar Azul and founder of Flor Piedra and Damas Gratis is known to be the creator of the cumbia villera "sound". However, a lighter form of cumbia enjoyed widespread popularity in Argentina during the 1990s. Antonio Rios (ex-Grupo Sombras, ex-Malagata) is a good representative of the Argentinian cumbia from the 1990s.

Bolivia
The cumbia sound from Bolivia usually incorporates Afro-Bolivian Saya beats and Mexican influenced tecnocumbia.

Cumbia marimbera (Central America)
In the south and southeast of Mexico (states of Chiapas and Oaxaca) is traditional the use of the modern marimba (Percussion instrument made of native wood from Guatemala) as this instrument was developed in the region, extending its use to much of Central America, particularly in Guatemala, El Salvador, Honduras and Nicaragua. Since the early 1940s, several Central American composers created music pieces using the rhythm of cumbia giving an original touch.

Among the main drivers of the cumbia are Nicaraguans Victor M. Leiva with "Cumbia piquetona", Jorge Isaac Carballo with "Baila mi cumbia", Jorge Paladino with "Cumbia Chinandega" and groups like Los Hermanos Cortés with "A bailar con Rosita", "Entre ritmos y palmeras" and "Suenan los tambores" and Los Alegres de Ticuantepe with "Catalina". In El Salvador, Los Hermanos Flores with "La cumbia folclórica", "Salvadoreñas" and "La bala". The Guatemalan orchestra "Marimba Orquesta Gallito" is the most famous between cumbia marimbera bands/orchestras. From Mexico, there are orchestras like "Marimba Chiapas" and "Marimba Soconusco".

Chile

In Chile, cumbia was also introduced by recordings made in Colombia. Chilean cumbia was born when Luisín Landáez, a Venezuelan singer, achieved success with songs like "Macondo" or "La Piragua" and when the Colombian Amparito Jiménez recorded in Chile "La pollera colorá", among other songs. Cumbia is one of the most popular dance forms in Chile. They have a style of their own, Chilean cumbia, and some of the most successful orchestras of this genre include Sonora Palacios, Viking 5, Giolito y su Combo, and La Sonora de Tommy Rey. However, Cumbia's popularity has been declining since the success of reggaeton in the mid-2000s, losing part of the preferences of the popular sectors of society.

Nowadays, Cumbia is gaining new attention as a result of emergence of acts formed by younger musicians usually labelled as "La Nueva Cumbia Chilena" (The new Chilean Cumbia), including bands such as Chico Trujillo, Banda Conmoción, Juana Fe, Sonora Barón, Sonora de Llegar, Chorizo Salvaje, Sonora Tomo como Rey, and Villa Cariño, among others. These new bands offer some of the classic tones and sounds of Chilean cumbia blended with rock or other folk Latin American styles. La Noche and Américo are also very popular acts, although they perform a more traditional style of Chilean cumbia, in some extend related to the style that dominated during the 1990s.

El Salvador
In El Salvador, Cumbia was performed by Orchestras such as Orchestra San Vicente, Los Hermanos Flores and Grupo Bravo.

Mexico

In the 1940s, the Colombian singer Luis Carlos Meyer Castandet emigrated to Mexico, where he worked with the Mexican orchestra director Rafael de Paz. Their album La Cumbia Cienaguera is considered the first cumbia recorded outside Colombia. Meyer Castandet also recorded other hits, including Mi gallo tuerto, Caprichito, and Nochebuena. Colombian cumbia and porro began to become popular in Mexico combined with local sounds, with Tony Camargo creating the beginnings of Mexican cumbia. Later styles include the Technocumbia, tropical Cumbia, Cumbia grupera, Mexican Andean Cumbia, and Cumbia sonidera, which uses synthesizers and electric batteries.

In the 1970s, Aniceto Molina emigrated to Mexico, where he joined the Guerrero group La Luz Roja de San Marcos and recorded many popular tropical cumbias, such as La Cumbia Sampuesana, El Campanero, El Gallo Mojado, El Peluquero, and La Mariscada.

Other popular Mexican cumbia composers and performers include Fito Olivares, Los Angeles Azules, Los Caminantes, and Grupo Bronco(Bronco).

Nicaragua
Nicaragua became a stronghold of Cumbia music during the 1950s and 1960s. The country has its own variation of cumbia music and dance. Mostly known for its cumbia chinandegana in the Northwestern section of the country, it has also seen a rise in cumbia music artists on the Caribbean coast like Gustavo Layton.

Peru

Peru, like other American countries, was invaded by the first cumbia recordings made in Colombia from the north and from the capital. During the mid-1960s began to appear on national discography from various music labels like Virrey, MAG, and Iempsa, orchestras like Lucho Macedo and Pedro Miguel y sus Maracaibos. Since the early 60s', the Cumbia Peruana has had great exponents. While initially had strong influences from Colombian cumbia, over time it has achieved a unique and distinctive style with shades or rhythms influenced by rock, Huayno, native dances of the jungle, waltz, bolero, merengue, salsa, etc., we can say that it is continually changing or evolving. The rhythm was understood soon in all regions of the country, prompting some groups to introduce some Peruvian musical elements, making electric guitars protagonists. Contributions from Peru to the cumbia are interpretation, compositions and variations like Tropical andean cumbia; thanks to the contribution of Peruvian cumbia, this genre is known throughout South America.

Peruvian cumbia, particularly from the 1960s to mid-1990s, is generally known as "Chicha", although this definition is quite problematic as both Peruvian cumbia and Chicha currently co-exist and influence each other (good examples include Agua Marina's popular cover of Los Eco's "Paloma Ajena" and Grupo Nectar's cover of Guinda's "Cerveza, Ron y Guinda"). Peruvian cumbia started in the 1960s with groups such as Los Destellos, and later with Juaneco y Su Combo, Los Mirlos, Los Shapis, Cuarteto Continental, Los Diablos Rojos, Pintura Roja, Chacalon y la Nueva Crema and Grupo Néctar. Some musical groups that play Peruvian cumbia today are: Agua Marina, Armonia 10, Agua Bella, and Grupo 5. These groups would be classified as Cumbia but often take songs and techniques from Chicha and Huayno in their stylings or as songs. Grupo Fantasma was a Peruvian-Mexican cumbia group. Andean Cumbia, is a style that combines Andean music and cumbia. This style has even become popular in Mexico, as some groups like Grupo Saya claim to be Cumbia andina mexicana, Mexican Andean Cumbia.

Venezuela

Since the 1950s the cumbia has great success and impact in Venezuela due to its proximity to Colombia and to the emigration of Colombians. Two of the oldest Venezuelan tropical orchestras that begin to perform and record cumbia in the country were Los Melódicos and Billo's Caracas Boys. The most significant contributions have been creating Venezuelan cumbia styles using melodic organs and harps.

Famous Artists/Groups 

 Aniceto Molina
 Armando Hernandez
 Margarita Vargas
 Rodolfo y Su Tipica
 Rodolfo Aicardi
 Sonora Dinamita

See also
 Baila
 Cumbia villera
 Music of Latin America
 New Chilean cumbia
 Ska
 Cha cha cha
 Latin Grammy Award for Best Cumbia/Vallenato Album
 Tamborito
 Totó la Momposina
 Tropical music
 La Pollera Colorá

References

Bibliography
 Abadía, Guillermo. Compendio general del folclor colombiano. 1983 4a ed., rev. y acotada. 547 p.: ill.; 22 cm. Bogotá: Fondo de Promoción de la Cultura del Banco Popular. (3. ed en 1977).
 Davidson, Harry. Diccionario folclórico de Colombia. Tomo III. Banco de la República, Bogotá, 1970.
 Ocampo, Javier. Música y folclor de Colombia. Enciclopedia Popular Ilustrada, No. 5. Bogotá, Plaza y Janés. 2000. .
 Revista Colombiana de Folclore. No. 7, Vol. III. Bogotá, 1962.
 Ballanoff, Paul A. Origen de la cumbia Breve estudio de la influencia intercultural en Colombia. América lndígena 31, no 1: 45-49. 1971.
 Zapata Olivella, Delia. La cumbia, síntesis musical de la Nación colombiana. Reseña histórica y coreográfica. Revista Colombiana de Folclor 3, no. 7:187-204. 1962
 Rangel Pava, Gnecco. Aires guamalenses. Kelly, 1948.
 Pombo Hernándes, Gerardo. Kumbia, legado cultural de los indígenas del Caribe colombiano. Editorial Antillas, 1995.

External links

A Musical Journey Through Cumbia
In a Nutshell: Cumbia Guide to cumbia (English)
Report about flauta de millo, by Plinio Parra
Report about Karval , by Musico independiente de artista cumbia colombiana

 
Colombian styles of music
Colombian styles of dance
Latin American folk dances
Native American dances
Tropical music
Music of the African diaspora